is a Japanese supplementary school in Indianapolis, Indiana. Classes are held at the Orchard School.

History
It opened in 1981. Previously the International Center hosted classes. By 1986 the Orchard School hosted the Japanese school's classes. The school had around 40 students, with some having parents working at some twenty companies which were branches of Japanese firms, including subsidiaries of Enkei, Sanyo, Sony, and Uniden. Some students had parents were academics at area universities, including Indiana University and Purdue University. By then the Indiana Japanese School served around two to three students who were living in Columbus, all of them children of Enkei employees.

By 1997 it had 308 students, including Columbus and West Lafayette students, with most of them being children of company employees. That year the school, which served K-12, was the largest of the Indiana hoshuko.

Curriculum
As of 1986, mathematics, science, and the Japanese language are the main courses taken. By 1997 the course offerings also included social studies, and each day had five hours of instruction.

References

Further reading
 
  - English abstract included

External links
 Indiana Japanese Language School 

Asian-American culture in Indiana
Japanese-American culture
Schools in Indianapolis
Indianapolis
1981 establishments in Indiana
Educational institutions established in 1981